In the 2012–13 season, KK Crvena zvezda will compete in the Basketball League of Serbia, Kup Radivoja Koraća, Eurocup and Adriatic League.

Players

Current roster

Depth chart

Roster changes

In

Out

Statistics

Adriatic League

Updated: 23 March 2013
1 Stats with Crvena zvezda (partial season).

Eurocup

Updated: 19 February 2013

Basketball League of Serbia

Updated: 12 June 2013
1 Stats with Crvena zvezda (partial season).

Awards
Basketball League of Serbia Weekly MVP

 Radivoj Korać Cup MVP –  DeMarcus Nelson
 Radivoj Korać Cup Best Scorer –  Michael Scott

Competitions

Adriatic League

Standings

Pld – Played; W – Won; L – Lost; PF – Points for; PA – Points against; Diff – Difference; Pts – Points.

Matches

Semifinal

Final

Eurocup

Regular season

Last 16

Basketball League of Serbia

Standings

P=Matches played, W=Matches won, L=Matches lost, F=Points for, A=Points against, D=Points difference, Pts=Points

Matches

Kup Radivoja Koraća

Quarterfinal

Semifinal

Final

References

External links
 Official website 
 KK Crvena zvezda at adriaticbasket.com

KK Crvena Zvezda seasons
Crvena